Petrol Ofisi A.Ş. is a fuel products distribution and lubricants company in Turkey. It is owned by Dutch Vitol Group. Vitol completed its acquisition of Petrol Ofisi from OMV AG in June 2017.

Petrol Ofisi had 1900+ fuel stations in 2022 in Turkey.

History
It was established on February 18, 1941 as a state owned company to import, stock, refine and distribute petroleum products. It became a joint stock company in 1983.

On July 24, 2000, the company was privatized, and initially 51% of the shares were purchased by Doğan Holding. On March 13, 2006, the Austrian petroleum company OMV bought 34% of the stake for US$1.054 billion. After this stock exchange, the share of Doğan Group decreased from 86.7% to 52.7%. On October 22, 2010 OMV announced that it will buy 54.17% shares from the Doğan Holding for the sum of EUR 1 Billion, setting its total stake in the company to 95.75%. The transaction remained subject to approval by relevant authorities until December 22, 2010 when it was completed. 

Within the scope of the agreement signed between Petrol Ofisi and Chevron Brands International (Chevron) in 2021, Texaco started the production of mineral oil products.

See also

 Enerco Energy

References

External links
 Official Petrol Ofisi website—

Oil and gas companies of Turkey
Chemical companies of Turkey
Automotive fuel retailers
Turkish brands
Companies based in Istanbul
Non-renewable resource companies established in 1941
Companies listed on the Istanbul Stock Exchange
Turkish companies established in 1941